Alena Valeryevna Ledeneva (Russian: Алёна Валерьевна Леденёва; born May 1964)  is  Professor of Politics and Society at the School of Slavonic and East European Studies (SSEES), University College London (UCL). She is known for her studies of blat, corruption and informal practices in Russia.

Career
Ledeneva studied Economics at the Novosibirsk State University (1986) and Social and Political Theory at the University of Cambridge (Newnham College, M.Phil.1992; Ph.D.1996). She was  Postdoctoral Research Fellow at New Hall College, Cambridge (1996–1999); Senior Fellow at the Davis Center, Harvard University (2005); Simon Professor at the University of Manchester (2006), Visiting Professor at Sciences Po, Paris (2010) and Visiting Professor at the Institute of Advanced Studies, Paris (2013–2014). She is a member of Valdai Discussion Club. Ledeneva has led the UCL pillar in the large-scale research project funded by the European Commission's Seventh Framework Program -  Anticorruption Policies Revisited: Global Trends and European Responses to the Challenge of Corruption (ANTICORRP) (2012-2017).

Research

Ledeneva's 'discovery' of informal practices started with a research of blat – the use of personal networks for getting things done in Russia (Ledeneva 1998). It has helped solve a double puzzle in the history of authoritarian regimes: how people survived in an economy of shortage, and how the regime survived under similar constraint. But it also opened an avenue to explore the nature of political and economic regimes from a new perspective — the perspective of informal practices. Informal practices have become an important indicator in assessing models of governance.

In How Russia Really Works (2006) she has identified the informal practices that have replaced blat in the functioning of the political and economic institutions of the 1990s. This book has been translated into Chinese and Korean.

Arguing that such practices constitute important indicators in assessing models of government, the third volume in the trilogy, Can Russia Modernise: Putin's System, Power Networks and Informal Governance (2013), focuses on the role of clientele networks in informal governance, an emerging supra-national concern, and on the demands that network-based governance systems make on political leaderships.

These monographs (Cambridge 1998; Cornell 2006; Cambridge 2013) constitute a trilogy on Russia that explores workings of informal networks in the Soviet times (grassroots networks), post-Soviet transition of the 1990s (professional networks) and in contemporary Russia (power networks).

The interdisciplinary study of informality has been relevant for studying social capital, consumption, labour markets, entrepreneurship, trust, mobility and migration, shortages, barter, survival strategies, alternative currencies, the shadow economy, redistribution and remittance economies, and democracy (demonstrable in citation index). All these developments illustrate efforts to re-integrate social dimensions into studies of politics and economy and have policy implications.

Ledeneva's research into "sistema" - systemic corruption in Russian politics - has received coverage in relation to Russian interference with other nations' politics, especially with the 2016 U.S. presidential election.

In 2018, she published the Global Encyclopaedia of Informality (UCL Press, 2018), an ambitious two volume work containing the work of over 200 contributors on the subject of informality. Both volumes are available to download for free.

Selected publications

 Russia's Economy of Favours (Cambridge University Press, 1998)
 How Russia Really Works (Cornell University Press, 2006)
 Can Russia Modernise? Sistema, Power Networks and Informal Governance (Cambridge University Press, 2013)
 The Global Encyclopaedia of Informality, Volume 1 (Open access) (UCL Press, 2018)
 The Global Encyclopaedia of Informality, Volume 2 (Open access) (UCL Press, 2018)

References

External links
Ledeneva's website at UCL

Academics of University College London
British sociologists
Alumni of the University of Cambridge
1964 births
Living people
British people of Russian descent
British women sociologists